SS Cayuga was a steel-hulled American package freighter in service between 1889 and 1895. She was built in 1889 in Cleveland, Ohio, by the Globe Iron Works Company for the Lehigh Valley Transit Company of Buffalo, New York. One of five identical sister ships, Cayuga entered service in 1889, carrying package freight between Buffalo and Chicago, Illinois, also making stops in Milwaukee, Wisconsin, and Gladstone, Michigan. Prior to her sinking, Cayuga was involved in two accidents. In the first in 1890, when she went aground in a gale just outside of Buffalo harbour; six tugboats managed to pull her free that same day. The second accident occurred in 1891, when Cayuga was involved in a collision with the package freighter Delaware near Cheboygan, Michigan. 

On the morning of May 10, 1895, Cayuga while bound for Buffalo with a cargo of oats, flour and general merchandise. A thick fog hung over Lake Michigan. As Cayuga neared Ile Aux Galets, her crew spotted the lights of the downbound wooden freighter . At 4:00 or 4:30a.m., Joseph L. Hurd struck Cayuga on her starboard side, tearing a hole in her hull; Joseph L. Hurd lost her bow, but was kept afloat by her cargo, while Cayuga sank 25 minutes later. The passing freighter Manola rescued the crews of the two vessels. The steward/cook of Joseph L. Hurd was the only casualty.

The wreck of Cayuga was located later in 1895. Due to her value, multiple attempts to raise her were made between 1896 and 1900 by Captain James Reid of Bay City, Michigan. His efforts were plagued by problems such as decompression sickness, the loss of several steel pontoons, a derrick barge and the alleged death of a hard-hat diver. Cayugas wreck was re-discovered in the spring of 1969 by John Steele and Gene Turner.

History

Background
In 1843, the gunship USS Michigan, built in Erie, Pennsylvania, became the first iron-hulled vessel constructed on the Great Lakes. In the mid-1840s, Canadian companies began importing iron vessels prefabricated by shipyards in the United Kingdom. However, it would not be until 1862 that the first iron-hulled merchant ship, Merchant, was fabricated in Buffalo, New York. Despite the success of Merchant, wooden vessels remained preferable to iron ones until the 1880s, due to their affordability and the region's abundance of timber. In the early 1880s, shipyards around the Great Lakes began to construct iron ships on a relatively large scale; in 1882, Onoko, an iron freighter, temporarily became the largest ship on the lakes. In 1884, the first steel freighters were built on the Great Lakes, and by the 1890s, the majority of ships constructed on the lakes were steel.

Design and construction

Cayuga (US official number 126556) was built on the banks of the Cuyahoga River in 1889 in Cleveland, Ohio, by the Globe Iron Works Company. The second of five identical sister ships built between 1888 and 1890, she was one of the first steel freighters built on the Great Lakes, as well as the fourteenth steel ship built by the Globe Iron Works Company. Cayuga was named after Cayuga Creek, a stream in western New York.

Cayuga's gross register tonnage was 2,669, with a net register tonnage of 1,939.

She was powered by a  85 rpm triple expansion steam engine. Steam for the engine was provided by two   Scotch marine boilers. Cayugas engine and boilers were both built by the Globe Iron Works Company. She cost $250,000 (equivalent to $ in ) to build.

Service history

Commissioned by Buffalo's Lehigh Valley Transit Company whose fleet was managed by John Gordon and later W.P. Henry, Cayuga was launched on April 2, 1889 as yard number 24, and made her maiden voyage in May that same year. Although her home port was Buffalo, she was initially enrolled in Cleveland on May 31, 1889. She was re-enrolled in Buffalo on June 3, 1889. She carried package freight on her regular route between Buffalo and Chicago and made stops in Milwaukee, Wisconsin, and Gladstone, Michigan.

Throughout her career, Cayuga was involved in several accidents. The first serious incident occurred on April 9, 1890. She was unladen and left Buffalo harbor at around 4:00 p.m. towed by the tug S.W. Gee. Upon clearing the breakwater in a full gale, Cayuga became unmanageable. She drifted onto a shoal, broke free and onto the rocks at the foot of Georgia Street. Due to the storm, the life saving crew could not shoot a breeches buoy to Cayuga until the weather had abated and her stern was firmly aground. Cayuga was freed at around 9:00 a.m. by six tugs. Several of her keel plates were damaged; all of her propeller blades broke off; and she lost her rudder shoe.

In November 1891, Cayuga collided with the wooden package freighter Delaware off Cheboygan, Michigan.

Final voyage

Sources differ whether Cayuga was heading to Buffalo from Chicago or Milwaukee. One source states she left Buffalo for Milwaukee on May 5, and left Milwaukee at 8:00 a.m. on May 9. Meanwhile, the wooden freighter Joseph L. Hurd, commanded by Captain Charles E. Wilson, was bound from Duluth, Minnesota, for Chicago with a cargo of lumber (specifically pine boards) and package freight.

A thick fog obscured visibility as the wind distorted the sound of the vessels' fog whistles. The fog soon concealed the vessels from one other. Cayugas engine was reversed which only slowed her down rather of stopping her. Joseph L. Hurd lost  of her bow, but was kept afloat by her cargo of pine boards. The force of the collision caused Cayuga to roll to port; she then righted herself, and began to sink. Cayuga went down in 25 minutes.

Aftermath
The crew of Cayuga and Joseph L. Hurd escaped in lifeboats and were picked up by the bulk freighter Manola. The only casualty of the accident was Joseph L. Hurds cook/steward George Johnson, who fell overboard and drowned. The day after the collision, Joseph L. Hurd was towed to Harbor Springs, Michigan, by the wrecking tug Favorite. She was repaired and returned to service. Cayuga was insured for $175,000 (equivalent to $ in ) and her cargo was insured for $90,000 (equivalent to $ in ).

Lloyd's of London libeled Joseph L. Hurds owners for $200,000 (equivalent to $ in ). The collision was determined to have been caused by mistaken passing signals. Captain Graser stated in a letter to supervising inspector general James Dumont that if Joseph L. Hurd had also reversed her engine, the collision would not have occurred.

Cayuga wreck

Salvage attempts
The day after Cayuga sank, the Chicago Tribune stated that:Among practical marine men, it was believed that the steamer [Cayuga] could ultimately be got afloat again, but it was thought the expense would amount to nearly all she was worth. The work must be done with pontoons, and will be a long, tedious job.

The first expedition attempting to locate Cayuga on May 13, 1895 was cancelled due to a gale. Several people searched for Cayuga after she sank. Five days after the incident, Captain Cyrus H. Sinclair of the Chicago based C.A. McDonald & Company spent a day unsuccessfully searching for her. By June, the underwriters had offered a $1,000 (equivalent to $ in ) reward to anyone who could find Cayugas wreck. On June 18, Captain Wilbur of the package freighter City of Grand Haven abandoned his search for Cayuga after ten days.

On June 28, Captain Sinclair travelled to Cheboygan, to begin a new search. Using the tug George W. Cuyler, on June 30 he steamed to the position recorded by Captain Martin Swain of the wrecking tug Favorite. Sinclair planned to locate the wreck by dragging George W. Cuylers anchor. A few minutes after Sinclair began searching for Cayuga, he managed to locate her, and planted a buoy at the wreck site. The following day, George W. Cuyler and the tug Major Dana recovered a flagpole, a boom and portions of Cayugas bulwarks and rigging. For his efforts, Captain Sinclair was paid $2,000 (equivalent to $ in ) by the underwriters.

By August 22, the underwriters had received bids from the Murphy Wrecking Company of Detroit, Michigan, and James Reid & Sons of Bay City, Michigan, to raise the wreck. On September 12, Captain James Reid signed a $100,000 (equivalent to $ in ) contract with the underwriters to raise Cayugas wreck . Reid planned to start work on Cayuga in 1896, once the ice on Lake Michigan had melted.

There it would be patched up and pumped out. Most of the oats in Cayugas cargo hold were recovered. In November, Captain Reid suspended the salvage operations, but claimed he would resume them in spring 1897. By February 1897, Captain Reid claimed to have spent more than $40,000 (equivalent to $ in ) on his salvage efforts. On June 9, Captain Reid managed to break Cayuga free from the mud where she was embedded. He continued to work on Cayugas wreck until 1900, when he abandoned the salvage attempts.

Reid's salvage efforts were plagued by problems. The pontoons attached to her hull frequently broke free. Captain Reid and several of his divers sustained severe injuries and decompression sickness. One diver allegedly died when a derrick barge reportedly sank on top of him. The barge later sank completely when one of the air-filled pontoons broke free and shot to the surface. One tug used in the salvage operation burned. The salvage attempts nearly bankrupted Captain Reid's company.

Cayuga today

The wreck of Cayuga was re-discovered in spring 1969 by John Steele and Gene Turner of Illinois. Her cabins no longer exist. The wreck is partially collapsed forward of the engine room with the bow has broken away and is lying on its port side. Her stern is intact. The remains of Cayugas cargo remain in her hold. There are also two spare propeller blades within the hull. Four of the pontoons used during the salvage attempts are still attached to Cayugas hull and the sunken derrick barge lies off her port side. The air hose of the lost diver was reportedly still poking out from under the derrick barge when the wreck was found. Cayugas wreck is protected by the  Straits of Mackinac Shipwreck Preserve as part of an underwater museum.

Notes

References

Sources

 
 
 
 
 
 
 
 
 
 
 
 
 
 
 
 
 
 
 
 
 
 
 
 
 
 
 
 
 
 
 
 
 
 
 
 
 
 
 
 
 
 
 
 
 
 
 
 
 
 

1889 ships
Great Lakes freighters
Ships built in Cleveland
Ships built by the Globe Iron Works Company
Maritime incidents in 1890
Maritime incidents in 1891
Maritime incidents in 1895
Ships sunk with no fatalities
Shipwrecks of Lake Michigan
1969 archaeological discoveries
Shipwreck discoveries by John Steele
Shipwrecks of the Michigan coast
Package freighters
Ships powered by a triple expansion steam engine
Ships sunk in collisions
Merchant ships of the United States
Wreck diving sites in the United States